The 1999 World Women's Curling Championship (branded as 1999 Ford World Women's Curling Championship for sponsorship reasons) was held at Harbour Station in Saint John, New Brunswick from April 3–11, 1999.

Teams

Round robin standings

Round robin results

Draw 1

Draw 2

Draw 3

Draw 4

Draw 5

Draw 6

Draw 7

Draw 8

Draw 9

Playoffs

Brackets

Final

References
 

World Women's Curling Championship
W
C
Curling competitions in Saint John, New Brunswick
C
Women's curling competitions in Canada
April 1999 sports events in Canada
1999 in Canadian women's sports
1999 in New Brunswick